Edward Mathew Wilson (January 3, 1875 – death date unknown) was an American Negro league pitcher in the 1900s.

A native of Bellevue, Pennsylvania, Wilson made his Negro leagues debut in 1900 with the Cuban Giants. He went on to play for the Philadelphia Giants in 1906 and 1907.

References

External links
 and Seamheads

1875 births
Place of death missing
Year of death missing
Cuban Giants players
Philadelphia Giants players
Baseball pitchers
Baseball players from Pennsylvania
People from Bellevue, Pennsylvania